Peter Fidler (16 August 1769 – 17 December 1822) was a British surveyor, map-maker, fur trader and explorer who had a long career in the employ of the Hudson's Bay Company (HBC) in what later became Canada. He was born in Bolsover, Derbyshire, England and died at Fort Dauphin in present-day Manitoba. He married Mary (Methwewin) Mackagonne, a Cree woman, and together they had 14 children.

Career
Fidler joined the Hudson's Bay Company as a labourer at London and took up his post at York Factory in 1788. He was promoted to clerk and posted to Manchester House and South Branch House in what later became Saskatchewan within his first year. In 1790, he was transferred to Cumberland House and given training in surveying and astronomy by Philip Turnor who also trained David Thompson. On 23 December 1788, Thompson had seriously fractured his leg, forcing him to spend the next two winters at Cumberland House convalescing which gave Fidler the opportunity to accompany Turnor on an exploration expedition to the west from 1790 to 1792 attempting to find a route to Lake Athabaska  and Great Slave Lake and therefore a route to the Pacific Ocean. Although the river route to the west his employer sought was found not to exist, on this and following expeditions Fidler gathered data for the first of several maps that he produced. Information he gathered was incorporated into the maps of North America produced by Aaron Arrowsmith.

In 1795, the London Committee of the HBC sent Fidler inland again, this time to map the area west of Lake Winnipegosis where Charles Thomas Isham had built three posts - Swan River House, Marlborough House, and Somerset House. Fidler helped Isham establish another fort at Carlton House (Assiniboine River), not to be confused with Fort Carlton (Saskatchewan River) which is a National Historic Site. The following May, Fidler moved on to Buckingham House as surveyor.

He established Bolsover House (near Meadow Lake, Saskatchewan) in 1799; Greenwich House at Lac la Biche, also in 1799, Chesterfield House in 1800; and Nottingham House in 1802. While at Chesterfield House, Fidler collected valuable information and maps about Blackfoot Confederacy territory throughout the Upper Missouri region, including two maps drawn by Ackomokki.

In 1806, after two years of harassment by Samuel Black of the rival North West Company, Fidler surrendered Nottingham House on Lake Athabasca and fled the post with his men.

Fidler was surveyor and district manager at Brandon House between 1814–1819, including when the post was plundered by a group of men who days later would be involved in the Battle of Seven Oaks.

In his will he requested that anything remaining from his other bequests be placed in a fund and the interest be allowed to accumulate until August 16, 1969, at which time the whole would be paid to the next male heir in descent from his son Peter. As of 1946 this fund could not be located.

Recognition
Fidler Point on Lake Athabasca is named for Fidler. There is a large carved monument to Fidler at Elk Point, Alberta and a monument to his legacy at Fort Dauphin created by the Manitoba Land Surveyors.  In his home town of Bolsover, there is a local nature reserve containing a monumental cairn named after him.

Sources
 
 
 
 
 
 
Peak Finder: Peter Fidler
The Great Canadian Rivers

References

External links
Maps of Peter Fidler at SFU
Peter Fidler and his Metis Descendants (PeterFidler.com)
Uncharted Surveyor: The Peter Fidler Story.  An educational film.
Peter Fidler - The Forgotten Geographer
Peter Fidler's Birthplace
Peter Fidler, Manitoba's Master Surveyor by George Siamandas
Alberta's Land Surveying History: Peter Fidler
Manitoba Agricultural Hall of Fame: Peter Fidler
Introducing Peter Fidler during the fur trade

1769 births
1822 deaths
Hudson's Bay Company people
Canadian cartographers
Canadian explorers
Canadian surveyors
Explorers of Canada
North West Company people
People from Bolsover
Persons of National Historic Significance (Canada)
Canadian fur traders
English cartographers
English surveyors
English explorers of North America
People of Rupert's Land
Pre-Confederation British Columbia people